Shahid Matangini Hazra Government College for Women, established in 2015, is located in West Bengal, India, is an undergraduate women's college in Purba Medinipur district. It offers undergraduate courses in arts and science. This college is affiliated to Vidyasagar University.

Departments

Arts

Bengali
English
Philosophy
Political Science
Sanskrit

Science
Mathematics
Geology
Geography
Physics
Chemistry
Economics

See also

References

External links
http://www.matanginicollege.org/ 

Universities and colleges in Purba Medinipur district
Colleges affiliated to Vidyasagar University
Educational institutions established in 2015
2015 establishments in West Bengal